The European Affairs Committee is a committee of the French National Assembly.

History 
In 2019, Pieyre-Alexandre Anglade was elected as the committee's chairman; however, due to disagreements with incumbent chairwoman Sabine Thillaye who refused to accept the legality of the vote, he did not take office.

Chairmen 
 Sabine Thillaye - 15th legislature of the French Fifth Republic

See also 
 European Scrutiny Committee (United Kingdom)

References 

Committees of the National Assembly (France)